Halesia carolina, commonly called Carolina silverbell or little silverbell, is a species of flowering plant in the family Styracaceae, native to the southeastern United States.

Description
The flowers are followed by green, four-winged fruit. The leaves turn yellow in autumn.

Range
The range of little silverbells is very restricted. It is principally in the panhandle of Florida, with isolated smaller outlier populations in South Carolina, Georgia, Alabama, Mississippi. In the cited reference, this species is referred to as Halesia parviflora. The "champion" Halesia carolina on the 2015 American Forests' National Register of Champion Trees is quite removed from its natural range, being situated in Roxbury, New Hampshire.

Taxonomy
There is a great deal of confusion in the four-winged American silverbells. Four principal species names have been used: H. carolina, H. parviflora, H. monticola, and H. tetraptera. The taxon being described here is the one that has also been described as H. parviflora. Some botanists have discarded the name H. carolina because the original material is viewed as ambiguous; others maintain that the original material is this species, so carolina is here being used instead of parviflora, since H. carolina L. has clear precedence.

Cultivation
In cultivation in the United Kingdom, H. carolina Vestita Group has gained the Royal Horticultural Society's Award of Garden Merit. It requires an acid or neutral soil, in a partially shaded position.

References

External links

carolina
Flora of the Southeastern United States
Flora of the Appalachian Mountains
Natural history of the Great Smoky Mountains
Plants described in 1759
Taxa named by Carl Linnaeus